Nieuw Jacobkondre (also Njoeng Jacob Kondre or just Jacobkondre) is a town in the Sipaliwini District of Suriname. It is situated on the Saramacca River. The village is inhabited by Matawai people.

Overview
The village of Jacobkondre was founded in the 1860s by Jacob Tooti. The original village was deserted around 1910, and a new settlement was built nearby.

The village has a school, clinic, and church. In 2014, a police station was opened in Nieuw Jacobkondre, because of increased crime at the nearby gold mines and the garimpero (illegal gold miner) village of Villa Brazil.

Transport
Nieuw Jacobkondre can be reached via an unpaved road which connects to the Southern East-West Link and from there to the rest of the country.  The Njoeng Jacob Kondre Airstrip also serves Nieuw Jacobkondre.

References

Bibliography
 

Matawai settlements
Populated places in Sipaliwini District